Moro Witch Doctor is a 1964 Filipino adventure film written and directed by Eddie Romero, and co-produced by Romero, Kane W. Lynn and Irwin Pizor (doing business as "Hemisphere Pictures"). The film stars Jock Mahoney, Margia Dean, Pancho Magalona, Reed Hadley, Paraluman, Vic Diaz and Michael Parsons. The film was shot back to back with The Walls of Hell.

The film originally ran 90 minutes. It was sold to Robert L. Lippert who arranged for it to be released in November 1964, by 20th Century Fox in a 61-minute version.

Plot
CIA agent Jefferson Stark is ordered to the Philippines to investigate the double homicide of two American plantation owners, Cameron and Kruger. Authorities believe the two were killed as a result of local gun smuggling and drug dealing. Cameron's sister Paula helps Stark in his investigation, and learns her brother is still alive and has gone into hiding from the syndicate. Stark discovers the plantation is all just a cover for the crime ring's smuggling operations. A fanatical cult leader named Datu Sumlang tries to buy the property, but when Paula refuses to sell, her brother's ex-friends start getting murdered. Stark uses Paula as a lure by telling her to meet him in Manila with a suitcase full of money. She gets attacked by the supposedly dead Kruger, and Stark comes to Paula's aid and kills him. With Kruger's death, the crime ring dissolves and her brother Cameron is exonerated.

Cast 
Jock Mahoney as CIA Agent Jefferson Stark
Margia Dean as Paula Cameron
Pancho Magalona as Martin Gonzaga
Reed Hadley as Robert Collins
Paraluman as Selisa Noble
Michael Parsons as Ackerman
Dale Ishimoto as Manuel Romblon
Vic Diaz as Salek
Jay Ilagan as Mahmud
Bruno Punzalan as Datu Sumlang
Nemia Velasco as Mulan
Jerry Uslander as Tom Cameron
Paul Edwards Jr. as Arthur Kruger

Production
Margia Dean later recalled "It was a dangerous film to do. That was really roughing it. We had machine-gunned guards all along... Jock Mahoney was not very pleasant to work  with... He was a pompous ass."

See also 
 The Walls of Hell

References

External links 
 
Moro Witch Doctor at TCMDB
Moro Witch Doctor at BFI

1964 films
20th Century Fox films
American action films
1960s action films
Films directed by Eddie Romero
1960s English-language films
1960s American films